Ernesto Sevilla López (born 16 May 1978) is a Spanish TV director, actor, comedian, screenwriter and TV presenter.

Career
He began as a screenwriter for Paramount Comedy. In July 2015 he became a main character in La que se avecina with Jordi Sánchez and Nathalie Seseña. He appeared in an advertising campaign for Amena. In February 2018 he presented with Joaquín Reyes the 32nd Goya Awards. He portrayed the TV series Capítulo 0 with Joaquín Reyes, which was released on 11 September 2018. In April 2019 he will appeared in the film I Can Quit Whenever I Want, directed by Carlos Therón and starring Amaia Salamanca, Cristina Castaño and Miren Ibarguren.

Personal life
From 2015 to 2016 he was in a relationship with the TV presenter Patricia Conde.

References

External links
 
 

1978 births
Male actors from Castilla–La Mancha
Spanish comedians
Spanish television presenters
Spanish television directors
Living people
Spanish male television actors
Spanish directors
Spanish stand-up comedians
Spanish screenwriters
Spanish male film actors
21st-century Spanish male actors